Sean Lawrence McNanie (born September 9, 1961) is a former professional American football player who played defensive end for six seasons for the Buffalo Bills, Arizona Cardinals, and Indianapolis Colts.

References

External links
http://www.nfl.com/player/seanmcnanie/2520906/profile

1961 births
Living people
People from Mundelein, Illinois
Players of American football from Illinois
American football defensive ends
San Diego State Aztecs football players
Buffalo Bills players
Phoenix Cardinals players
Indianapolis Colts players